David Norman Pegler (born 2 November 1938) is a British mycologist. Until his retirement in 1998, he served as the Head of Mycology and assistant keeper of the herbarium at the Royal Botanic Gardens in Kew. Pegler received his BSc from London University in 1960, thereafter studying tropical Agaricales with R.W.G. Dennis as his graduate supervisor. He earned a master's degree in 1966, and a PhD in 1974 (both from London University). His graduate thesis was on agarics of east Africa, later published as A preliminary agaric flora of East Africa in 1977. In 1989, London University awarded him a DSc for his research into the Agaricales. 

A fungal genus Pegleromyces (family Tricholomataceae) published in 1981 by Rolf Singer, then genera Peglerochaete from India, (also in the family Tricholomataceae) by Sarwal & Locq. in 1983, and also several other fungal taxa have been named in his honour:
Cuphophyllus pegleri Lodge 1999
Deconica pegleriana (Guzmán) Ram.-Cruz & Guzmán 2012 
Endogone pegleri Y.J.Yao 1995 
Entoloma pegleri Courtec. 1984
Favolaschia pegleri Parmasto 1999
Inocybe pegleri Sarwal 1983
Inonotus pegleri Ryvarden 1975
Lactarius pegleri Pacioni & Lalli 1992
Marasmius pegleri Courtec. 1984
Melanospora pegleri D.Hawksw. & A.Henrici 1999
Rhodocybe pegleri T.J.Baroni 1999 (now Clitocybe pegleri)

Pegler has published more than 250 research papers and several books, largely on fungal systematics. He was senior editor of the scientific journal Mycologist from 1987 to 1993.

Selected publications

See also
List of mycologists

References

1938 births
British mycologists
Alumni of the University of London
Living people